Murat Jaleluly Maikeyev (Mūrat Jälelūly Maikeev; born 9 November 1959) is a Kazakh military figure who served as the Chief of the General Staff of the Armed Forces of the Republic of Kazakhstan from 2016 to 2019.

Biography 
He was born on 9 November 1959 in the Aktobe Region of Kazakhstan. He entered the Soviet Army at age 21 and attended the Alma-Ata Higher All-Arms Command School in 1980. In 1994, he attended the Frunze Military Academy in Russia. In September 2003, Maikeyev was appointed commander of the Airmobile Forces of the Armed Forces. In March 2010, he was appointed Commander-in-Chief of the Ground Forces. On 28 June 2014 Maikeyev graduated from the Military Academy of Belarus. On 15 September 2016 he was appointed Chief of the General Staff of the Armed Forces of the Republic of Kazakhstan. He was relieved of his duties on 5 April 2019.

Awards 

 Order for Service to the Motherland in the Armed Forces of the USSR, 3 degrees
 Order of Aybyn, 2nd degree (2001)
 Order of Glory, 1st degree (2017)
 Order of Glory, 2nd degree (2012) 
 Medal "Astana"
 Medal "10 years of Astana"
 Medal "For Contribution to the Development of International Cooperation" 
 Medal "For participation in peacekeeping operations"
 Medal "10 years of the Constitution of the Republic of Kazakhstan"
 Medal "10 years of the Armed Forces of the Republic of Kazakhstan"
 Medal "20 years of the Armed forces of the Republic of Kazakhstan"
 Medal "For Impeccable Service" 2nd and 3rd degrees
 Medal "70 years of the Armed forces of the USSR"
 Medal "60 years of the liberation of the Republic of Belarus from Nazi invaders"
 Medal "5 years of the Armed Forces of the Republic of Tajikistan"
 Medal "10 years of the Armed Forces of the Republic of Tajikistan"
 Medal of Zhukov
 Army General Margelov Medal
 Medal "For the military cooperation of the Mongolian People’s Army and the Soviet Army" 
 Medal "70 years of the creation of the Airborne Troops of the USSR"

References 

1959 births
Living people
Kazakhstani military personnel
People from Aktobe
Kazakhstani generals
Chiefs of the General Staff (Kazakhstan)
Frunze Military Academy alumni